Wang Tong is a Chinese basketball player.

In October 2016, he signed with the Brisbane Bullets of the Australian NBL as a developmental player. After playing in three games with the team, he returned to the Shanghai Sharks.

CBA personal records

References

External links
Wang Tong at Asia-basket.com
Wang Tong at RealGM

1995 births
Living people
Basketball players from Hebei
Brisbane Bullets players
Chinese expatriate basketball people
Chinese expatriate sportspeople in Australia
Chinese men's basketball players
Forwards (basketball)
Guards (basketball)
Shanghai Sharks players